Samuel Herbert Davies (5 November 1894 – 1972) was a Welsh amateur footballer who played in the Scottish League for Queen's Park and Morton as a left back. He was capped by Wales at amateur level.

References 

Welsh footballers
English Football League players
Wales amateur international footballers
Association football fullbacks
1894 births
Footballers from Wrexham
Queen's Park F.C. players
Greenock Morton F.C. players
Scottish Football League players
1972 deaths
Place of death missing
Crewe Alexandra F.C. players
Altrincham F.C. players